is a rechargeable contactless smart card ticketing system for public transport in Kanazawa, Japan, introduced by Hokuriku Railroad (Hokutetsu), from December 1, 2004. The name is the portmanteau of IC and card, as well as ai (love), hoping the card will be loved by users. Just like JR East's Suica or JR West's ICOCA, the card uses RFID technology developed by Sony corporation known as FeliCa. There is a mascot fairy character called .

Types of cards
Normal cards
Prepaid card
Commuter pass
Junior card
Special discount card
Memorial card

Usable area

Bus lines
Both prepaid cards and commuter passes are accepted. Basically, only local bus lines in/around Kanazawa accept the card.
Hokuriku Railroad
Hokutetsu Bus
Hokutetsu Kanazawa Chūō Bus
Kaga Hakusan Bus
Kanazawa Flat Bus

Railway lines
Only commuter passes are accepted.
Asanogawa Line
Ishikawa Line

External links 
  Official website by Hokuriku Railroad

Fare collection systems in Japan
Contactless smart cards